The English College, Lisbon (Portuguese: Convento dos Inglesinhos) was a Roman Catholic seminary that existed from the 17th century to the 20th century.

Early history

In 1624 a college for English students wishing to study for the Catholic priesthood, and for mission work in England, was founded in Lisbon by Pedro Coutinho, a member of a prominent family. It was known as SS. Peter and Paul's (with greater formality the Pontifical English College of Sts Peter and Paul - Lisbon). It was awarded the same rights and privileges as the English College, Rome and was one of the Pontifical Colleges in the sense of being centrally controlled from Rome, one of the substantial group of institutions set up with the aim of maintaining the Catholic faith in England, Ireland, and Scotland.

The moving force behind the foundation was the priest William Newman (1577–1640), though he never became head of the College. Newman had been entrusted with property from the estate of the late Nicholas Ashton, a Catholic chaplain in Lisbon. Initial progress was slow after a papal brief of Pope Gregory XV in 1622, with only a church erected on property given by Coutinho, who also gave endowment. Richard Smith, the Catholic bishop in England, took a hand and sent one of his archdeacons, Joseph Haynes (also Hynes, Harvey). The foundation was supported by the arrival of group of students and teachers from the English College, Douai in 1628, the first president being Haynes. Haynes, however, then died quite suddenly, shortly after the college opened in 1629.

The second president was Thomas White, alias Blacklow, with William Clifford as vice-president. He was at the College for three years from 1630. His rules for its governance brought it under the Bishop of Chalcedon (the title used at the time by the Catholic bishop in England). Pursuing further funding and students in England, he was dissatisfied at the results and resigned.

Later history

It suffered severely from the earthquake of 1755, but continued its work. The College finally closed in 1973.

People associated with the College

John Ignatius Bleasdale, student
Edward Booth, student
James Yorke Bramston, student
William Clifford, vice-president
Humphrey Ellis, student in 1628
Daniel Fitter, student
Peter Gooden, student
John Goter, student and president-elect
Victor Guazzelli, student later bishop
Thomas Hall, student
William Hall, student
Thomas Haydock
Roger Hesketh
William Hilton, born in 1825; educated at Lisbon; ordained 1850; served some time on the mission in the Diocese of Shrewsbury, England; made a domestic prelate in 1881; and returned to Lisbon as president in 1883.
Edward Pickford, student and first alumnus president
Richard Russell, bishop
John Sergeant
Thomas Tylden
Thomas White, second president 1630–1633

References

Attribution

1624 establishments in Portugal
Educational institutions disestablished in 1973
Catholic seminaries
Defunct universities and colleges in Portugal